Calvin Krime was a hardcore band in Minneapolis, Minnesota during the late 1990s. The trio formed in 1995 when Sean Tillmann, Jon Kelson, and Jason Ralph met at Perpich Center for Arts Education while in their teens. Signed to Amphetamine Reptile, their primary audience was in the punk and noise scene dominant in South Minneapolis at the time. Usually, Calvin Krime was booked in smaller venues and often at house parties. During their three-and-a-half years together, they released two albums (Dress for the Future & You're Feeling So Attractive) and an EP (3x3x3 1/2). The group disbanded in 1998. Afterwards, all the members went on to other bands, including Sean Tillmann, who went on first to Sean Na Na and then to his persona as Har Mar Superstar.

Eleven years after their break-up, Calvin Krime played a reunion show at the Uptown Bar in Minneapolis, Minnesota on September 13, 2009.  Tillmann, Kelson & Ralph also reunited to play The Amphetamine Reptile 25th Anniversary gala on August 29, 2010.

Members 
Sean Tillmann bass, vocals, keyboard
Jon Kelson guitar, vocals
Jason Ralph drums

Discography 
Calvin Krime - Pretty in Pink 7-inch (1995)
Calvin Krime - Kids Incarcerated 7-inch (1996)
Calvin Krime - Dress for the Future (1997) Amphetamine Reptile
Calvin Krime - You're Feeling So Attractive (1998) Amphetamine Reptile
Calvin Krime - 3x3x3 1/2 (1998) Polyvinyl
Calvin Krime - Dope-Guns-N'-Fucking in the Streets, Vol. 11 compilation Amphetamine Reptile

Related Bands 
Har Mar Superstar
Seaquest
Sean Na Na
Shotgun Monday

References

Amphetamine Reptile Records artists
Musical groups established in 1996
Punk rock groups from Minnesota
Hardcore punk groups from Minnesota
American post-hardcore musical groups